Večita plovidba (Serbian Cyrillic: Вечита пловидба, trans. Eternal sail) is a compilation album by Serbian and former Yugoslav rock band Galija, released in 1997.

Track listing
"Avanturista" - 4:26
"Decimen" - 4:53
"Gospi" - 3:43
"Digni ruku" - 3:12
"Još uvek sanjam" - 4:41
"Put" - 5:54
"Burna pijana noć" - 4:11
"Da li si spavala" - 3:09
"Kad me pogledaš" - 4:38
"Zebre i bizoni" - 2:59
"Mi znamo sudbu" - 3:26
"Žena koje nema" - 4:11
"Na tvojim usnama" - 3:12
"Korak do slobode" - 2:52
"Skadarska" - 4:13
"Trube" - 3:35
"Seti se maja" - 3:17
"Pravo slavlje" - 4:15

Credits
Nenad Milosavljević - vocals
Predrag Milosavljević - vocals
Jean Jacques Roscam - guitar
Bata Zlatković - flute
Dušan Karadžić - bass guitar
Boban Pavlović - drums
Zoran Radosavljević - bass guitar
Predrag Milanović - bass guitar

1997 compilation albums
PGP-RTS compilation albums
Galija compilation albums